Joshua Simmonds (born 4 October 1995) is a field hockey player from Australia.

Personal life
Joshua Simmonds was born and raised in Ringwood, Victoria.

He is a member of the Victorian Institute of Sport, and has referenced Floyd Mayweather as his sporting hero.

Career

Club level
At club level, Joshua Simmonds plays hockey for Doncaster Hockey Club in the Victorian Premier League. He has also played for YMCA Coastal City Hockey Club in the Western Australia Premier Competition.

State level
Throughout his youth, Joshua Simmonds represented his home state, Victoria, in all domestic competitions.

In 2014, Simmonds was recruited by the NT Stingers in the Australian Hockey League as an import player. Following his AHL debut for the Northern Territory, Simmonds returned to play for the VIC Vikings from 2015 onwards. This included winning the championship at the 2016 edition.

Following the overhaul of the AHL in 2018, Simmonds was selected to represent HC Melbourne in Hockey Australia's new domestic league, Hockey One, in 2019.

National teams

Under–21
Joshua Simmonds made his junior international debut for the Australia U–21 side in 2015, at the Sultan of Johor Cup, where the team finished fifth.

In 2016, Simmonds went on to represent the side again; at the Sultan of Johor Cup and Junior World Cup.

Kookaburras
Following two years in the national development squad, Simmonds made his senior international debut for the Kookaburras in 2018 during a test match against Argentina in Darwin, Northern Territory. He then went on the represent the team during the International Hockey Open. In November 2018, Simmonds was named in the Kookaburras squad for the 2019 calendar year.

Simmonds started 2019 in the Kookaburras team during the FIH Pro League in Melbourne, Victoria. Simmonds continued to represent the team during the Pro League, culminating with a gold medal in Amstelveen, following a 3–2 win over Belgium.

Simmonds was selected in the Kookaburras Olympics squad for the Tokyo 2020 Olympics. The team reached the final for the first time since 2004 but couldn't achieve gold, beaten by Belgium in a shootout.

References

External links
 
 
 

1995 births
Living people
Australian male field hockey players
Sportsmen from Victoria (Australia)
Field hockey players at the 2020 Summer Olympics
Olympic field hockey players of Australia
Male field hockey defenders
Olympic silver medalists for Australia
Medalists at the 2020 Summer Olympics
Olympic medalists in field hockey
20th-century Australian people
21st-century Australian people
Field hockey players at the 2022 Commonwealth Games
Commonwealth Games gold medallists for Australia
Commonwealth Games medallists in field hockey
Field hockey players from Melbourne
People from Ringwood, Victoria
Medallists at the 2022 Commonwealth Games